Whitewash is a paint-like covering of hydrated lime or a cheap white paint.

Whitewash may also refer to:

Government and law
 Whitewashing (censorship), a term for censorship
 Whitewash procedure, in shareholder law, a legal procedure regarding financial assistance

Arts and entertainment
 Whitewash (1994 film), an American television animated short film
 White Wash (film), a 2011 American documentary film
 Whitewash (2013 film), a Canadian drama film
 Whitewash (book), a 2017 nonfiction book by Carey Gillam
 Whitewash (sport), a sports series in which one side wins every contest
 Whitewashing (beauty), modifying the skin tones of photographs of nonwhite people in mass media
 Whitewashing in film, the practice of casting white actors in non-white roles
 Whitewash Jones, a racist caricature from the 1940s comic book Young Allies

See also
 Blanqueamiento, branqueamento, or "whitening", a social practice in many post-colonial countries to "improve the race" towards a supposed ideal of whiteness
 Racial whitening, branqueamento in Brazil between 1889 and 1914
 Shutout, a sports contest in which one side prevents the other from scoring any points
 The most basic type of thickening agent used in cooking, flour blended with water to make a paste.